Chariesthes fairmairei is a species of beetle in the family Cerambycidae. It was described by Per Olof Christopher Aurivillius in 1922, originally under the genus Hapheniastus. It is known from the Central African Republic and Gabon.

References

Chariesthes
Beetles described in 1922